Korf Poshteh-ye Ilyati (also Romanized as Korf Poshteh-ye Īlyātī) is a village in Tutaki Rural District, in the Central District of Siahkal County, Gilan Province, Iran. At the 2006 census, its population was 51, in 16 families.

References 

Populated places in Siahkal County